Cerianthidae is a family of tube-dwelling anemones in the order Spirularia of the subclass Ceriantharia.

Genera
The World Register of Marine Species includes the following genera in the family:
 Anthoactis Leloup, 1932
 Apiactis Beneden, 1897
 Bursanthus Leloup, 1968
 Ceriantheomorphe Carlgren, 1931
 Ceriantheopsis Carlgren, 1912
 Cerianthus Delle Chiaje, 1830
 Engodactylactis Leloup, 1942
 Isodactylactis Carlgren, 1924
 Nautanthus Leloup, 1964
 Pachycerianthus Roule, 1904
 Paradactylactis Carlgren, 1924
 Parovactis Leloup, 1964
 Peponactis Van Beneden, 1897
 Plesiodactylactis Leloup, 1942
 Sacculactis Leloup, 1964
 Solasteractis Van Beneden, 1897
 Synarachnactis Carlgren, 1924
 Syndactylactis Carlgren, 1924
 Trichactis Leloup, 1964

References

 
Spirularia